Raul, Raúl, Raül, and Raüll are forms of a common first name in Italian, Portuguese, Romanian, Spanish, Galician, Asturian, Basque, Aragonese, and Catalan.  The name is cognate of the Anglo-Germanic given name Ralph or Rudolph and the French Raoul, and is derived from Old English Rædwulf through Radulf. It is also a popular common boy name in Azerbaijan.

The name is usually spelled "Raul" in Portuguese, Italian, and Rumanian; "Raúl" in Spanish; and "Raül" or "Raüll" in Catalan.

People with that name

 Raoul (founder of Vaucelles Abbey) (d. 1152), also known as Saint Raul  
 Raúl Acosta (born 1962), Colombian road cyclist
 Raúl Alfonsín (1927–2009), former President of Argentina (1983–89)
 Raúl Albiol (born 1985), Spanish footballer
 Raul Amaya (born 1986), American mixed martial artist
 Raúl Baena (born 1989), Spanish association football player
 Raul Boesel (born 1957), Brazilian race car driver
 Raúl Castañeda (born 1982), Mexican boxer
 Raúl Castro (born 1931), First Secretary of the Communist Party of Cuba, brother of Fidel Castro
 Raúl Correia (born 1993), Angolan footballer
 Raúl Diago (born 1965), Cuban volleyball player
 Raúl de Tomás (born 1994), Spanish footballer
 Raul Di Blasio (born 1949), Argentinian pianist
 Raúl Esparza (born 1970), Cuban-American actor and singer
 Raúl Fuentes Cuenca (born 1975), Spanish pop singer
 Raul Geller (born 1936), Peruvian-Israeli footballer
 Raúl Giménez (born 1950), Argentine opera singer
 Raúl (footballer) (born 1977), Spanish footballer Raúl González
 Raúl González Robles (born 1991), Spanish footballer
 Raúl Ibañez (born 1972), Cuban American baseball player
 Raúl Jiménez (born 1991), Mexican footballer
 Raúl Juliá (1940–1994), Puerto Rican actor
 Raul Kivilo (born 1973), Estonian archer
 Raul Mälk (born 1952), Estonian diplomat and politician
 Raúl Mesa (born 1982), Spanish beach volleyball player
 Raúl Montaña (born 1971), Colombian road cyclist
 Raul Plassman (born 1944), Brazilian football goalkeeper and TV commentator
 Raúl Prebisch (1901–1986), Argentinian economist
 Raul Rebane (born 1953), Estonian journalist and communication consultant
 Raul Renter (1920–1992), Estonian economist and chess player
 Raul Roco (1941–2005), Philippine politician
 Raúl Ruidíaz (born 1990), Peruvian footballer 
 Raúl Ruiz (director) (1941–2011), Chilean director and filmmaker
 Raul Rusescu (born 1988), Romanian footballer
 Raül Romeva (born 1971), Spanish economist and politician
 Raul Salvatierra (born 1991), Bolivian basketball player
 Raul Seixas (1945–1989), Brazilian singer–songwriter
 Raul Siem (born 1973), Estonian politician
 Raúl Tito (born 1997), Peruvian footballer
 Raul (entertainer) (born 2003), Japanese singer and entertainer

See also
 Ralph (disambiguation)
 Rahul
 Raoul (disambiguation)

References

Portuguese masculine given names
Spanish masculine given names
Estonian masculine given names
Romanian masculine given names